Hrozný is a Czech, Slovak, and Ukrainian surname. It is a cognate of the Russian word Grozny. Notable people with the surname include:

 Bedřich Hrozný (1879–1952), Czech orientalist and linguist (for whom asteroid 5946 Hrozný is named)
 Vyacheslav Hrozny (born 1956), Ukrainian soccer coach

References

See also
 

Czech-language surnames
Ukrainian-language surnames